Breuil-sur-Vesle (literally Breuil on Vesle; before 2018: Breuil) is a commune in the Marne department in northeastern France. Breuil-Romain station has rail connections to Reims and Fismes.

Population

See also
Communes of the Marne department

References

Communes of Marne (department)